Carl Johan Styrbjörn Molund (born 13 October 1975) is a Swedish Olympic sailor. He finished 12th in the 470 event at the 2000 Summer Olympics together with Mattias Rahm and 4th in the 470 event at the 2004 Summer Olympics together with Martin Andersson.

References

Swedish male sailors (sport)
Olympic sailors of Sweden
470 class sailors
Royal Gothenburg Yacht Club sailors
Sailors at the 2000 Summer Olympics – 470
Sailors at the 2004 Summer Olympics – 470
1975 births
Living people
Europe class world champions
World champions in sailing for Sweden
20th-century Swedish people